Crutchfield is a surname.

Crutchfield may also refer to:
Crutchfield Corporation, an electronics retailer
Crutchfield, Kentucky
Crutchfield, North Carolina

See also
Crutchfield Crossroads, North Carolina